The Croatian Sailing Federation is the national governing body for the sport of sailing in Croatia, recognised by the International Sailing Federation.

History
The Croatian Sailing Federation was founded in 1950 in Zagreb.

References

External links
 

Croatia
Sailing
Yachting associations
Sailing governing bodies
1950 establishments in Croatia
Sailing in Croatia